Cursed Films is an American documentary streaming television series produced by Shudder, a streaming service owned by AMC Networks. Written, edited and directed by Jay Cheel, the series covers alleged instances of curses surrounding films. It premiered April 2, 2020 on Shudder with mixed to positive reviews.

In August 2020, Shudder renewed the series for a second season which premiered on April 7, 2022.

Description 
The documentary series focuses on alleged curses that afflicted the production of notable horror/non-horror films. Each episode focuses on a single film and includes interviews with individuals who worked on said films. The series also includes interviews with journalists and film critics who comment on the alleged curses.

Episodes

Series Overview

Season 1 (2020)

Season 2 (2022)

See also 
Superstitions
New Hollywood
Twilight Zone accident
Urban legends

References

External links
IMDb
Official website
Official trailer

American documentary television series
Shudder (streaming service) original programming
2020 American television series debuts
Film and video fandom